Robert Douglas Thomas Pattinson (born 13 May 1986) is an English actor. Known for starring in both big-budget and independent films, Pattinson has ranked among the world's highest-paid actors. In 2010, Time magazine named him one of the 100 most influential people in the world, and he was featured in the Forbes Celebrity 100 list.

After starting to act in a London theatre club at age 15, Pattinson began his film career by playing Cedric Diggory in the fantasy film Harry Potter and the Goblet of Fire (2005). He gained worldwide recognition for portraying Edward Cullen in The Twilight Saga film series (2008–2012), which grossed over $3.3 billion worldwide. After starring in the romantic dramas Remember Me (2010) and Water for Elephants (2011), Pattinson began working in independent films from auteur directors. He received praise for his starring roles in David Cronenberg's thriller Cosmopolis (2012), James Gray's adventure drama The Lost City of Z (2016), the Safdie Brothers' crime drama Good Time (2017), Claire Denis' science-fiction drama High Life (2018), and Robert Eggers' psychological horror film The Lighthouse (2019). He returned to mainstream films with a leading role in Christopher Nolan's spy film Tenet (2020), and starred as Batman in Matt Reeves' superhero film The Batman (2022).

Aside from acting, Pattinson plays music and has sung on several soundtracks for film. He supports several charities, including the GO Campaign, and has been the face of Dior Homme fragrance since 2013.

Early life
Pattinson was born on 13 May 1986 in London, the youngest of three children of Clare (Charlton), a scout at a modelling agency, and Richard Pattinson, a vintage car dealer. He grew up in a small home in Barnes with two older sisters, Elizabeth (Lizzy) and Victoria. Pattinson started learning the guitar and piano at the age of four. He attended Tower House School, from which, aged 12, he was expelled for shoplifting adult magazines at a post office shop and selling them later to his male classmates. He completed his schooling at The Harrodian School. As a teenager he worked as a photo model for British fashion brands and magazines to improve his pocket money and developed a love of cinema where he counted Jack Nicholson, Marlon Brando and Jean-Paul Belmondo among his acting idols. In his late teens and early twenties, he performed acoustic guitar gigs at open mic nights in pubs around London where he sang his own written songs either solo under the stage name Bobby Dupea, or with his band Bad Girls.

Pattinson considered becoming a musician or going to university to study speech-writing, but never thought about pursuing an acting career; his teacher in school even advised him not to join the drama club because she thought he was not suited for the creative arts. However, when he was 13, he joined the local amateur theatre club called Barnes Theatre Company after his father convinced him to attend because he was quite shy. At age 15 and after two years of working backstage, he auditioned for the play Guys and Dolls and he got his first role as a Cuban dancer with no lines. He got the lead role of George Gibbs in the next play Our Town, was spotted by a talent agent who was sitting in the audience and he began looking for professional roles. He also appeared in the plays Macbeth, Anything Goes, and Tess of the d'Urbervilles. Pattinson had planned to go to university, but couldn't because the shoot for Harry Potter and the Goblet of Fire went over schedule. He used to share a flat in London's Soho with fellow actor and good friend Tom Sturridge.

Career

2004–2007: Career beginnings
Pattinson had supporting roles in the German made-for-television film Ring of the Nibelungs in 2004, and in director Mira Nair's costume drama Vanity Fair, although his scenes in the latter were deleted and only appear on the DVD version. In May 2005, he was scheduled to appear in the UK premiere of The Woman Before at the Royal Court Theatre, but was fired shortly before the opening night and was replaced by Tom Riley.  Later in 2005, Pattinson played Cedric Diggory in Harry Potter and the Goblet of Fire. Pattinson learned how to scuba dive to play the role of Diggory. For this role, he was named the 2005 "British Star of Tomorrow" by The Times. During this period, he was hailed as "the next Jude Law".

In 2006, Pattinson appeared in The Haunted Airman a psychological thriller, aired on BBC Four on 31 October, and he earned favourable reviews. The Stage praised his performance by saying that "[he] played the airman of the title with a perfect combination of youthful terror and world weary cynicism." On 19 February 2007, he appeared in a supporting role in a one-off television drama based on the best-selling novel by Kate Long, The Bad Mother's Handbook.

2008–2013: The Twilight Saga and worldwide recognition

In 2008, Pattinson was cast as Edward Cullen in Twilight, based on the novel by Stephenie Meyer. According to TV Guide, Pattinson was apprehensive about auditioning, fearful that he would not be able to live up to the "perfection" expected from the character. The film was released on 21 November 2008 and turned Pattinson into a movie star overnight. Although the film received mixed reviews, critics praised his chemistry with co-star Kristen Stewart. The New York Times called Pattinson a "capable and exotically beautiful" actor and Roger Ebert said he was "well-chosen" for the role.

Pattinson's other release of 2008, How to Be, was a low-budget comedy drama film written and directed by Oliver Irving. It screened at number of film festivals, earning mixed reviews from critics. Pattinson then starred as Salvador Dalí in the film Little Ashes, a Spanish-British drama directed by Paul Morrison. He also starred in a short film entitled The Summer House, directed by Daisy Gili. This short film was later re-released as a part of an anthology film titled Love & Distrust, comprising five short films following eight individuals from diverse backgrounds on their quest for true contentment.

Pattinson reprised his role as Edward Cullen in the Twilight sequel, The Twilight Saga: New Moon, which was released on 20 November 2009. The film earned a record-breaking $142,839,137 on its opening weekend and earned an overall $709,827,462 worldwide. Though the film received negative reviews, film critic Michael Phillips from the Chicago Tribune said that Pattinson was "interesting to watch" despite bad makeup. Bill GoodyKoontz from the Arizona Republic said that "Pattinson's actually not in the film that much, but he does his best when he's around" and Michael O'Sullivan of The Washington Post noted that his acting was "uniformly strong". New Moon brought Pattinson global stardom and made him one of the highest-paid actors in the world.

In 2009, Pattinson presented at the 81st Academy Awards ceremony. On 10 November 2009, Revolver Entertainment released the DVD Robsessed, a documentary on Pattinson's life and popularity. His next film, The Twilight Saga: Eclipse, was released on 30 June 2010, earning $698,491,347 worldwide. The film received mixed reviews. Kirk Honeycutt of The Hollywood Reporter praised Pattinson's performance, stating that "(he) makes you forget the white makeup and weird eye contact lenses – to focus on a character torn between his love for the human Bella (Stewart) and the knowledge that she'll have to let go of her beating heart if she's to stay with him forever". Will Lawrence of Empire Online praised the performance of three leads of the film, stating that "all three corners of the love triangle look sharper than before: the most accomplished actor, Stewart, still lip-biting, Lautner still pec-flexing, and Pattinson not fully shaking that fiery-eyed pout. But all have grown into their roles, cutting loose in a film that (thankfully) sidesteps the melodrama of its prequels".

Pattinson executive-produced and starred in the film Remember Me, which was released on 12 March 2010. Though the film received mixed reviews, some critics praised his performance. Jake Coyle of The Associated Press said that Pattinson had "an unmistakable screen presence" but "pour[ed] it on thickly and self-consciously. With low eyes, sleeves rolled up just so and cigarette drooping artfully from his mouth, Tyler (like Edward Cullen) is a reluctant romantic". However, Ian Nathan of Empire Online stated that the film was "the best thing" Pattinson had done. Kirk Honeycutt of The Hollywood Reporter praised his chemistry with co-star Emilie de Ravin in the film, stating that the "scenes between Pattinson and de Ravin exude genuine charm."

In 2011, Pattinson starred as Jacob Jankowski in Water for Elephants, adapted from the novel by Sara Gruen. The film received mixed reviews, but Pattinson's performance was praised. Film critic Richard Corliss from Time praised Pattinson for being "shy and watchful" and said that he "radiates a slow magnetism that locks the viewer's eyes on him", ultimately calling him "star quality". Mick LaSalle from the San Francisco Chronicle stated that Pattinson succeeded at holding his own at the center of a major feature and was "endlessly watchable". Peter Travers of the Rolling Stone said he "smolders" in the film and Todd McCarthy of The Hollywood Reporter said that "Pattinson is entirely convincing as Jacob".

Pattinson reprised the role of Edward Cullen in The Twilight Saga: Breaking Dawn – Part 1, which was released on 18 November 2011 and earned $705,058,657 at the worldwide box office. The film received mixed to negative reviews from critics. Review aggregation website Rotten Tomatoes reported that 24% of critics (of the 188 counted reviews) gave the film positive reviews; the site's consensus reads, "Slow, joyless, and loaded with unintentionally humorous moments, Breaking Dawn Part 1 may satisfy the Twilight faithful, but it's strictly for fans of the franchise". Pattinson also played Georges Duroy in a film adaptation of the 1885 novel Bel Ami, and the film had a world premiere at the 62nd Berlin International Film Festival. It was released on 12 February 2012.

Pattinson starred in the film adaptation of Don DeLillo's Cosmopolis, directed by David Cronenberg. The film competed for the Palme d'Or at the 2012 Cannes Film Festival. It was well received, with Pattinson's performance particularly praised. Justin Chang of Variety wrote, "An eerily precise match of filmmaker and material, Cosmopolis probes the soullessness of the 1% with the cinematic equivalent of latex gloves. ... Pattinson's excellent performance reps an indispensable asset." Robbie Collin of The Telegraph stated that it is a sensational performance from Robert Pattinson, "yes, that Robert Pattinson – as Packer. Pattinson plays him like a human caldera; stony on the surface, with volcanic chambers of nervous energy and self-loathing churning deep below." And Owen Gleiberman of Entertainment Weekly stated, "Pattinson, pale and predatory even without his pasty-white vampire makeup, delivers his frigid pensées with rhythmic confidence."

Pattinson starred one last time as Edward Cullen in the final instalment of the Twilight saga, The Twilight Saga: Breaking Dawn – Part 2 which was released on 16 November 2012, and has grossed over $829 million worldwide, becoming the highest-grossing film of the Twilight series. At Rotten Tomatoes, the film holds a 48% approval rating, based on 174 reviews with the consensus stating: "It is the most enjoyable chapter in The Twilight Saga, but that's not enough to make Breaking Dawn Part 2 worth watching for filmgoers who don't already count themselves among the franchise converts."

2014–2019: Independent films and critical acclaim

In May 2014, two of Pattinson's films premiered at the 2014 Cannes Film Festival. First, Pattinson starred in David Michôd's futuristic western The Rover, alongside Guy Pearce and Scoot McNairy. The film had its premiere out of competition at the festival. For his performance as a naïve simpleton member of the criminal gang, Pattinson drew rave reviews. Scott Foundas of Variety said that "Pattinson who turns out to be the film's greatest surprise, sporting a convincing Southern accent and bringing an understated dignity to a role that might easily have been milked for cheap sentimental effects." He further added that "(it is) a career re-defining performance for Pattinson that reveals untold depths of sensitivity and feeling." Todd McCarthy, writing for The Hollywood Reporter, wrote that "Pattinson delivers a performance that, despite the character's own limitations, becomes more interesting as the film moves along." Jessica Kiang in her review for The Playlist, noted that "(Pattinson) turns in a performance that manages to be more affecting than affected."

Next, he reunited with Cronenberg in Maps to the Stars, a satirical drama described as a darkly comic look at Hollywood excess. The film competed for the Palme d'Or at the 2014 Cannes Film Festival. In the film, he played the role of Jerome Fontana, a limo driver and struggling actor, who wants to be a successful screenwriter. Robbie Collin of The Daily Telegraph summed up his performance as "winningly played."

In 2015, two of his films premiered at the 65th Berlin International Film Festival in February. First he appeared in Werner Herzog's adaptation of Gertrude Bell's biopic film Queen of the Desert alongside Nicole Kidman and James Franco. Pattinson appeared as T. E. Lawrence aka Lawrence Of Arabia in the film, which Geoffrey Macnab of The Independent described as "comic and a very long way removed from Peter O'Toole. He plays Lawrence Of Arabia as a sharp-tongued, sardonic figure who can see through the pretensions of his bosses and colleagues." David Rooney of The Hollywood Reporter called his role "brief but significant" and concluded that "the easy camaraderie in his scenes with Kidman is appealing." Sam Adams of Indiewire said that, "Robert Pattinson gets relatively high marks for his brief turn as the bonafide T.E. Lawrence."

Next he starred in Anton Corbijn's Life as Life Magazine photographer Dennis Stock; the film deals with the friendship between actor James Dean and Stock. Critical reception for the film was mixed but Pattinson received appreciation for his performance as a photographer. Guy Lodge of Variety called his performance a "sly turn", Little White Lies said that "Pattinson's performance is as crisp as the white shirt and black suits his character always wears. This is a camouflage for his own problems that slowly unfurl, adding colour and improving the film." David Rooney of The Hollywood Reporter noted that Pattinson "gives arguably the most fully rounded performance."

In late 2015, Pattinson appeared in Brady Corbet's directorial debut film The Childhood of a Leader, alongside Bérénice Bejo and Stacy Martin. In the film, he played the dual roles, first a brief but crucial role of Charles Marker, a reporter in Germany during World War I and later as an adult version of the leader. He received praise for his performance, which Peter Bradshaw of The Guardian called "elegant" and Lee Marshall of Screen International described as "excellent".

In 2016, Pattinson appeared in Paramount Pictures and Plan B Entertainment's adaptation of The Lost City of Z, directed by James Gray. Premiered at the New York Film Festival, the film starred Pattinson as British explorer Corporal Henry Costin. He grew a heavy beard and lost  for the film. Earning critical praise for his role, Matt Neg of NBP described him as "one of the better actors working today",
Keith Uhlich in his review for Brooklyn Magazine called him "subtle scene-stealer", and Linda Marric writing for Heyuguys find his performance "an impressively subtle, yet brilliant."

Pattinson next starred in the Safdie Brothers' neo-grindhouse thriller Good Time, as a bank robber, Connie Nikas, which he has described as a "really hardcore kind of Queens, New York, mentally damaged psychopath, bank robbery movie." The film premiered in competition at the 2017 Cannes Film Festival and proved to be a turning point in his career. Pattinson's performance garnered critical acclaim. Guy Lodge of Variety described it as his "career-peak", Eric Kohn of Indiewire called it "his Career-Best" and David Rooney of The Hollywood Reporter drew comparisons with Al Pacino's Sonny Wortzik in Dog Day Afternoon, and ultimately noted it as "his most commanding performance to date." Pattinson received his first Independent Spirit Award nomination for Best Male Lead for his performance in the film.

In August 2017, while promoting Good Time, Pattinson wrote and starred in a short film for GQ, titled Fear & Shame, which was described by the magazine as, "Robert Pattinson Battles Fame and Fear to Get a New York Street Dog". Shot on the streets of New York, the film narrates Pattinson's journey to buy a hot dog while avoiding media and fans in the hustle of the city. The A.V. Club called it "bizarre and delightful". While IndieWire said that "he's got a bright" and "shimmering future".

Zellner Brothers' western-comedy Damsel was his first comedy since his 2008 film How to Be. Pattinson portrayed Samuel Alabaster, an eccentric pioneer who travels west in search of his fiancée. His performance was favourably received: the New York Post described it as a "hilariously oddball performance" and The A.V. Club found him "easily the best thing about Damsel".

His last film of 2018 was Claire Denis' science-fiction drama film High Life, set in space, about team of criminals traveling towards a black hole. Denis initially had Philip Seymour Hoffman in mind for the role of the protagonist, but after becoming aware of Pattinson's commitment and desire to work with her, she cast him in the role instead. Pattinson starred as Monte, one of the criminals on the spaceship, who became a father against his wishes through artificial insemination, and raised his daughter as the ship progressed to the black hole. Critics praised the film with Allen Hunter of Screen International noting Pattinson as the most "dominant" and "engaging" element in the film and Jason Bailey of The Playlist called it "another scorching Pattinson performance; he plays the character's menace and rebellion with brio".

Pattinson's first 2019 role was Robert Eggers's black-and-white psychological horror film The Lighthouse, set on a remote New England island in the 1890s. The film premiered at the Directors' Fortnight section of the 2019 Cannes Film Festival, with widespread critical acclaim for both the film overall and Pattinson's performance. In his review for The Guardian, Peter Bradshaw described Pattinson's performance as "mesmeric" and a "sledgehammer punch," which "just gets better and better." Gregory Ellwood, writing for Collider, said that Pattinson has "topped himself here" and his performance is "so transformative it's jarring. You simply never thought he had it in him." He received his second Independent Spirit Award nomination for Best Male Lead for the film.

Pattinson's following two film releases premiered at 2019 Venice Film Festival; he starred in his second collaboration with director David Michôd, an adaptation of William Shakespeare's plays titled The King. He played Louis, The Dauphin, who served as the nemesis of Henry V. For the role, Pattinson adopted a French accent, which he based on the fashion industry people of France. Though divided on his accent, critics found his performance the "scene-stealing" and "highlight" of the film. He then appeared in Ciro Guerra's Waiting for the Barbarians, based on a 1980 novel by J. M. Coetzee, alongside Mark Rylance and Johnny Depp. Boyd van Hoeij writing for The Hollywood Reporter called his character as "a rather flat supporting role", while The Guardian described his performance as "stiff" and "over-articulated".

2020–present: Return to mainstream films
Pattinson starred as a spy handler in Christopher Nolan's Tenet (2020), alongside John David Washington, and it marked his return to big-budget films. He based his character's mannerisms on those of author Christopher Hitchens. Jessica Kiang of The New York Times labelled him as "delightful" and praised his chemistry with Washington. Pattinson next featured as part of an ensemble cast in The Devil All the Time, a psychological thriller based on the novel by Donald Ray Pollock. Both the film and Pattinson's performance as a lewd small town preacher received mixed reviews. Nonetheless, Austin Collin of Rolling Stone found him "eely, eerie, [and] intriguing", while Owen Gleiberman of Variety noted that he did "a stylish job".

Pattinson starred as Bruce Wayne/Batman in Matt Reeves's 2022 superhero film The Batman. Reeves, following Ben Affleck's departure from the role, wrote the character of Bruce Wayne with Pattinson in mind after seeing his performance in Good Time. The announcement of Pattinson's casting was met with backlash from some Batman fans, but the ultimate portrayal of the superhero was applauded by critics following its release. 

In May 2021, Pattinson signed an overall first-look production deal that encompasses the whole spectrum of Warner divisions, including Warner Bros. Pictures, New Line Cinema, Warner Bros. Television, and HBO Max. The deal, which represents the actor's first foray into producing, also takes into account a range of releasing platforms, among them theatrical, SVOD and television.

Pattinson is set to star in Bong Joon-ho's upcoming science-fiction film Mickey 17 (2024), based on Edward Ashton's novel Mickey 7, for Warner Bros. Pictures.

Other ventures

Modelling and endorsements

Pattinson began modelling at age 12, but his workload began to decrease four years later. In December 2008, he blamed the lack of modelling work on his masculine appearance: "When I first started I was quite tall and looked like a girl, so I got lots of jobs, because it was during that period where the androgynous look was cool. Then, I guess, I became too much of a guy, so I never got any more jobs. I had the most unsuccessful modelling career." Pattinson appeared as a model for British teen magazines, and in the advertising campaign for Hackett's autumn 2007 collection.

In November 2010, Pattinson was approached by Burberry to be the face of their brand with a £1m deal, which he turned down.

In June 2013, Pattinson was announced as the new face of Dior Homme fragrance. In 2016, he also became the first brand ambassador of their Menswear collection. In late 2013, he appeared in a black and white short film with French-American model Camille Rowe, as the new face of Dior Homme Fragrances. Between 2013 and 2020, he appeared in three advertising campaigns of the fragrance for television and print. Collaboraters included directors Romain Gavras, Frédéric Sofiyana, and The Blaze, and photographers Peter Lindbergh, Nan Goldin and Mikael Jansson. Goldin also released a book titled Robert Pattinson: 1000 Lives, a collection of Pattinson's images from the 2013 campaign. In February 2016, he was also announced as the first ambassador of Dior Homme menswear and appeared in multiple of the brand's print collection campaigns, photographed by Karl Lagerfeld, Peter Lindbergh and David Sims. On his nearly decade long collaboration with the house of Dior, Pattinson said in 2020, "There's a timelessness to Dior, it feels like it's going to be around forever, it's a sort of monument."

Music
Pattinson plays the guitar and piano since age four, and writes his own music. He appears as the singer of two songs on the Twilight soundtrack: "Never Think", which he co-wrote with Sam Bradley, and "Let Me Sign", which was written by Marcus Foster and Bobby Long. The songs were included in the film after director Catherine Hardwicke added Pattinson's recordings into an early cut without his knowledge, and he agreed that "one of them specifically, it really made the scene better. It was like it was supposed to be there." The soundtrack for the film How to Be features three original songs performed by Pattinson and written by composer Joe Hastings. Pattinson has said, "I've never really recorded anything – I just played in pubs and stuff", and when asked about a professional music career, he said, "Music is my back-up plan if acting fails." In 2010, Pattinson was awarded the "Hollywood's Most Influential Top Unexpected Musicians" award.

In 2013, Pattinson played the guitar on the Death Grips song "Birds" from their album Government Plates, which was achieved by drummer Zach Hill recording Pattinson's playing on his phone in a jam session and later sampling the part into the song itself. In a March 2017 interview, Pattinson stated that he would contribute music to his upcoming film Damsel. Talking about it, he said that "I don’t play that much any more, though I am doing music for [‘Damsel’]. I used to differentiate between music and acting but the more I don't play music, the more I push that area of my brain into acting. I improvise like I would when I play music." In February 2019, Pattinson collaborated with the Nottingham band Tindersticks and released the song "Willow" for High Life original soundtrack.

In October 2020, Pattinson made a cameo appearance in the band Haim's performance of the song "3 a.m." on Late Night with Seth Meyers. He performed the song's opening spoken-word section via a front-facing facetime call video, reciting the lines of the phone call at the beginning of the song.

Philanthropy
Pattinson supports and promotes the ECPAT UK's campaign Stop Sex Trafficking of Children and Young People to stop human trafficking. At 2009 Cannes Film Festival amfAR event, he raised $56,000 for the cause. In June 2010, he donated his own artwork to PACT which auctioned on eBay, to help the organisation working for missing children. He also donated a sketch, drawn by himself, called Unfinished City which auctioned at $6,400. The money from the auction went to an Arizona-based homeless center Ozanam Manor. In January 2010, he participated in charity telethon Hope for Haiti Now: A Global Benefit for Earthquake Relief. In March 2010, he signed off guitar, the money raised from the auction went to Midnight Mission. He raised $80,000 for the GO Campaign by donating a meet and greet with himself on the set of Breaking Dawn and later again by auctioning a private screening of The Twilight Saga: Breaking Dawn – Part 1.

In August 2011, he helped to raise awareness towards the cancer by highlighting The Cancer Bites campaign during his acceptance speech at the 2011 Teen Choice Awards; he shared the details about the campaign which is working for the people suffering from cancer. In August 2013, he visited Children's Hospital Los Angeles, and participated in arts and crafts with the patients. In September 2013, he joined International Medical Corps and became one of their first responders, to help raise awareness before the disaster strikes by strengthen of communities. He participated in a charitable auction Go Go Gala, organised by GO Campaign and bought a cello made out of recycled material, at $5,600 on 15 November 2013. In March 2014, he donated autographed items for auction to raise funds for the Prostate Cancer Research Foundation. In May 2014, he donated his bike for an Auction to Benefit the Royal Flying Doctor Service (RFDS), who provide primary healthcare services to the people living in the outback. He participated in ALS Ice Bucket Challenge, promoting the awareness about amyotrophic lateral sclerosis (ALS). In November 2014, he participated in GO Campaign's annual charity function. In October 2015, he joined Global Goals Campaign, which aims to end poverty by 2030.

In 2015, Pattinson became the first ambassador of GO Campaign, he said that, "I've eagerly followed the growing impact GO Campaign has had over the years, on so many children and youth, and I love how tangible and transparent it is. They partner with some remarkable grassroots local heroes who are doing fantastic work but who lack the needed resources, and in places where a little bit of money can go a long way. I've been a donor and a supporter, and now I look forward to joining their efforts, so together we can give opportunity to even more kids and young adults across the globe." In May 2019, at the 2019 Cannes Film Festival, he co-hosted a charity event with Helen Mirren, organised by the Hollywood Foreign Press Association (HFPA). Pattinson along with Mirren donated $500,000 to international aid organisation Help Refugees on behalf of the HFPA.

During the first lockdown due to the COVID-19 pandemic in spring 2020, Pattinson donated to GO Campaign emergency funds, that were used to provide food and hygiene products to vulnerable families in London and Los Angeles. While shooting The Batman in Liverpool in October 2020, Pattinson surprised a ten-year-old autistic Batman fan by sending DC Batman gifts, because the boy waited every day on set to meet Pattinson, but could not do so because of COVID-19 restrictions.

Public image

Pattinson's sex appeal has been discussed by various media outlets including People magazine, which named him one of the "Sexiest Men Alive" in 2008 and 2009. In 2009, he was named the "Sexiest Man Alive" by Glamour UK. AskMen named Pattinson as one of the top 49 most influential men of 2009. In 2009, Vanity Fair named Pattinson "the most handsome man in the world" along with Angelina Jolie as the most beautiful woman in the world. Pattinson was named one of Vanity Fairs "Top Hollywood Earners of 2009" with estimated earnings of $18 million in 2009.

In December 2009, Pattinson autographed a guitar to be auctioned off for charity. He also volunteered for the Hope for Haiti Now: A Global Benefit for Earthquake Relief in January 2010. GQ and Glamour both named him the "Best Dressed Man" of 2010, with GQ describing the actor as "[e]xtremely elegant and inspiring, the true essence of a contemporary man." In 2010, People listed Pattinson in their "World's Most Beautiful" issue.

Britain's The Sunday Times "Rich List" put him on its "list of young millionaires" in the UK, worth £13 million. In 2010, Pattinson was named one of the 100 most influential people in the world by Time magazine, and was also featured on the Forbes Celebrity 100 list. On 14 November 2010, Pattinson received two BBC Radio 1 Teen Awards, Best Dressed and Best Actor.

In 2011, Pattinson was 15th on Vanity Fairs "Hollywood Top 40" with earnings of $27.5 million in 2010. GQ once again named Pattinson the "Best Dressed Man" of 2012. In October 2012, Pattinson was named "Sexiest Man Alive" by Glamour UK.

In 2013, Pattinson was 2nd on Glamour UKs "Richest UK Celebs Under 30" with earnings of £45 million. Britain's London Evening Standard named him one of the London's most influential people of 2013 in their The Power 1000. In February 2014, he appeared on the cover of World Film Locations: Toronto, a book about Toronto and the films shot in the city. A play about three mature women obsessed with Pattinson, titled Totally Devoted, debuted at Surgeons' Hall, Edinburgh on 13 August 2014. In October 2014, Pattinson was 3rd on Heat magazine'''s "annual rich list of young British stars" with earnings of $82.89 million. London Evening Standard included him in their list of 2014's London's 1000 most influential people.

Pattinson interviewed fellow actor Jamie Bell for Interview magazine, which was published on 20 July 2015.

In 2020, Pattinson topped the list of "The Most Handsome Men in the World" with a Golden Ratio of 92.15%, based on the Golden Ratio of Beauty Phi equation devised in Ancient Greece.

Personal life
Pattinson is reluctant to discuss his personal life and has expressed an aversion towards the paparazzi industry and tabloid journalism. In 2017, he opened up about suffering from anxiety, which began in his early years in the public eye.

In September 2020, amidst the COVID-19 pandemic, Pattinson was reported to have tested positive for COVID-19; filming for The Batman was halted just three days after it resumed. While Warner Bros. declined to comment on the identity of the person who had contracted the coronavirus, multiple sources with "knowledge of the production" confirmed that the person was Pattinson.

Relationships
In mid-2009, Pattinson became romantically linked to his Twilight co-star Kristen Stewart. In July 2012, Stewart was photographed with her Snow White and the Huntsman director Rupert Sanders, revealing an affair; the day the photos were released, Sanders, who was 19 years her senior and married at the time, issued a public apology for the affair, as did Stewart. Pattinson and Stewart split, but reconciled in October 2012. The pair eventually broke up in May 2013. 

Pattinson began dating singer-songwriter FKA Twigs in September 2014. The couple, who were engaged, ended their relationship in the summer of 2017. The breakup would inspire Twigs to make her sophomore studio album Magdalene (2019). 

Pattinson has been in a relationship with model Suki Waterhouse since mid-2018. As of July 2020, the couple resided in London.

Awards and nominations

Pattinson has received Best Actor award at Strasbourg Film Festival for his performance in How to Be (2009). For his work in The Twilight Saga, he has earned two Empire Awards nominations and won eleven MTV Movie Awards, two People's Choice Awards with additional other awards and nominations including winning 2009's Hollywood Film Award for New Hollywood by Hollywood Film Festival.

In 2014, he earned nominations from Australian Academy Awards (AACTA) and Canadian Screen Awards for his performances in The Rover and Maps to the Stars respectively."Canadian Screen Awards Unveil Nominations" . The Hollywood Reporter, 15 January 2015. He won Hollywood Rising Star Award for his performance in film Life from Deauville American Film Festival in 2015.

In July 2018, Pattinson received a top award at the closing of the 53rd edition of the Karlovy Vary International Film Festival.

Honours

Wax statues of Pattinson were added to the Madame Tussauds museums in London and New York City in 2010. Pattinson along with his Twilight co-stars, Kristen Stewart and Taylor Lautner put his signature, hand and foot prints in wet concrete at Grauman's Chinese Theatre on 3 November 2011. On 19 February 2014, Russian astronomer Timur Kryachko named an asteroid he had discovered after Pattinson, as 246789 Pattinson''.

He was honoured with a tribute at 2017 Deauville American Film Festival on 2 September 2017, with screening of selected films of his during the festival run.

Filmography

Film

Television

Discography

Soundtrack

References

External links

 

1986 births
Male actors from London
English male child actors
English expatriates in the United States
English male film actors
English pop guitarists
English male models
English male stage actors
English male television actors
Living people
People educated at The Harrodian School
People educated at Tower House School
People from Barnes, London
21st-century English male actors
21st-century British guitarists
21st-century English singers
English male singers
Method actors
21st-century British male singers